Dilfer is a surname. Notable people with the name include:
 Tori Dilfer (born 1999), American volleyball player; daughter of:
 Trent Dilfer (born 1972), American football coach and former player